Aleksandra Stanaćev (Serbian Cyrillic: Александра Станаћев; born September 25, 1994) is a Serbian female professional basketball point guard, who plays for Durán Maquinaria Ensino Lugo in the Spanish women basketball league (Liga DIA).

References

External links
Profile at Eurobasket.com

1994 births
Living people
Sportspeople from Kikinda
Serbian women's basketball players
Point guards
ŽKK Crvena zvezda players
Serbian expatriate basketball people in Spain